The Jatobá Hydroelectric Power Plant is a planned hydroelectric power plant and dam on the Tapajós river in the state of Pará, Brazil.
As of 2017 the project was suspended.

Location

The Jatobá Hydroelectric Power Plant will be built on the Tapajós river in the state of Pará, the second largest hydroelectric plant in the state.
The reservoir will cover .
The plant and reservoir will affect the municipalities of Itaituba and Jacareacanga.
The dam will be just upstream from the Sawré Muybu Indigenous Territory.
It would flood large areas of Munduruku territory, and of land used by traditional ribeirinhos communities.
The official estimate is that 1,303 people will be affected by the reservoir.

The plant will be part of the proposed  Tapajós hydroelectric complex on the Tapajos and Jamanxim rivers.
Others are the São Luiz do Tapajós (6,133 MW), Cachoeira dos Patos (528 MW), Jamanxim (881 MW) and Cachoeira do Cai (802 MW) dams, all under study, as well as the less advanced proposals for the Chacorão (3,336 MW) and Jardim do Ouro (227 MW).
The São Luiz do Tapajós, Jatobá and Chacorão dams on the Tapajós would together flood , including parts of the Amazônia and Juruena national parks and the Itaituba I and Itaituba II  national forests.

Technical

Excluding the existing river area,  will be newly flooded land.
The hydraulic head will be .

Assured energy will be .
Annual output will be .
The cost is estimated at US$4.4 billion.

Planning process

The measure reduced the size of other conservation units including the Amazônia National Park, and the Itaituba I, Itaituba II and Crepori national forests.
The Federal Prosecutor General (Procurador Geral da União) filed a lawsuit in February 2012 challenging the constitutionality of the measure.
Law 12.678 of 25 June 2012 confirmed provisional measure 558.

A "platform" approach is proposed for construction to minimise environmental impact.
There would be no access roads, and workers would be taken to the site by helicopter.
After construction is complete the site would be regenerated.
The dam and plant will be built by the Grupo de Estudo Tapajós consortium, composed of Eletrobras, Eletronorte, Électricité de France, Camargo Corrêa, CEMIG, Copel, Engie, Enersis and Neoenergia.
As of 2017 construction was suspended.

Notes

Sources

Hydroelectric power stations in Brazil
Dams in Pará
Proposed hydroelectric power stations
Proposed renewable energy power stations in Brazil